The City of Ottawa is the corporate entity of municipal government in Ottawa, Ontario, Canada. The corporation is responsible for provision of services to the public as well as enforcement of municipal by-laws.  It is overseen by the City Manager, and responsible to the Mayor of Ottawa (Mark Sutcliffe) and City Council.

History

The City of Ottawa Act, 1999 is an act of the legislature of Ontario which created the City of Ottawa. The Act was first passed in 1999 to provide for the 2001 amalgamation of the former Regional Municipality of Ottawa–Carleton, the former cities of Ottawa, Nepean, Kanata, Gloucester, Vanier and Cumberland, the former townships of West Carleton, Goulbourn, Rideau, and Osgoode, and the former village of Rockcliffe Park into the new City of Ottawa.

City of Ottawa Departments

City Manager
City Manager Steve Kannellakos serves as City Council's chief policy advisor and leads management and staff in implementing Council decisions. While overseeing policy development and major projects, Kannellakos actively promotes the City's interests with other levels of government and external organizations. In addition, Kannellakos is leading new initiatives, which include the implementation of City Council's long-term vision for Ottawa; building strong relationships with the community; improving corporate planning and performance reporting; and improving staff morale.

Business Transformation Services
Business Transformation Services is responsible for:
Improved customer and client service;
Improved employee development and engagement; and
Outcome-based performance management and reporting.

Community and Protective Services
The Community and Protective Services (CPS) Department brings together 11 service areas.

Planning, Transit and the Environment
Planning, Transit and the Environment (PTE) is one of the City of Ottawa's five departments. The others are City Manager, Business Transformation Services, Community and Protective Services, and Public Works and Services.

Planning, Transit and the Environment has five branches:

Office Of The Deputy City Manager
Transit Services
Planning
Building Code Services
Economic & Environmental Sustainability

Public Works and Services
To build, operate and maintain transportation, utility, fleet, parks and forestry services.

Elected Officials
Mayor 
City Councillors 

Office of the Auditor General

2010 Budget
The city of Ottawa draft budget has been tabled on January 28, 2010.

See also

References

External links
 Organizational chart
 City of Ottawa Act
 Centrepointe Theatre
 Shenkman Arts Centre
 Ottawa.com
 Lansdowne Park
 Ottawa Police Service
 OC Transpo
 UpFront Ottawa
 Choosing Our Future

Municipal government of Ottawa
2001 establishments in Ontario
Government agencies established in 2001